Douaisis Agglo (before 2019: Communauté d'agglomération du Douaisis) is the communauté d'agglomération, an intercommunal structure, centred on the city of Douai. It is located in the Nord department, in the Hauts-de-France region, northern France. It was created in January 2014. Its seat is in Douai. Its area is 235.7 km2. Its population was 148,784 in 2019, of which 39,613 in Douai proper.

Composition
The communauté d'agglomération consists of the following 35 communes:

Anhiers
Arleux
Aubigny-au-Bac
Auby
Brunémont
Bugnicourt
Cantin
Courchelettes
Cuincy
Dechy
Douai
Erchin
Esquerchin
Estrées
Faumont
Féchain
Férin
Flers-en-Escrebieux
Flines-lez-Raches
Fressain
Gœulzin
Guesnain
Hamel
Lallaing
Lambres-lez-Douai
Lauwin-Planque
Lécluse
Marcq-en-Ostrevent
Râches
Raimbeaucourt
Roost-Warendin
Roucourt
Sin-le-Noble
Villers-au-Tertre
Waziers

References

Agglomeration communities in France
Intercommunalities of Nord (French department)